Mohanpur is a village in Mohanpur CD block in the Deoghar subdivision of the Deoghar district in the Indian state of Jharkhand.

Geography

Location

Overview
The map shows a large area, which is a plateau with low hills, except in the eastern portion where the Rajmahal hills intrude into this area and the Ramgarh hills are there. The south-western portion is just a rolling upland. The entire area is overwhelmingly rural with only small pockets of urbanisation.

Note: The full screen map is interesting. All places marked on the map are linked in the full screen map and one can easily move on to another page of his/her choice. Enlarge the full screen map to see what else is there – one gets railway connections, many more road connections and so on.

Area

Demographics
According to the 2011 Census of India, Mohanpur had a total population of 177, of which 97 (55%) were males and 80 (45%) were females. Population in the age range 0–6 years was 32. The total number of literate persons in Mohanpur was 145 (48.28% of the population over 6 years).

Civic administration

Police station
There is a police station at Mohanpur village.

CD block HQ
Headquarters of Mohanpur CD block is at Mohanpur village.

Transport
There is a station at Mohanpur on the Jasidih-Dumka-Rampurhat line.

Education
Kasturba Gandhi Balika Vidyalaya, Mohanpur, at Chakrama, is a Hindi-medium girls only institution established in 2005. It has facilities for teaching from class VI to class XII.

References

Villages in Deoghar district